was a town located in Kitakoma District, Yamanashi Prefecture, Japan. 

As of 2003, the town had an estimated population of 6,127 and a density of 184.88 persons per km². The total area was 33.14 km².

On March 15, 2006, Kobuchizawa was merged into the expanded city of Hokuto. Therefore, Kitakoma District was dissolved as the result of this merger.

External links
 Hokuto official website 

Dissolved municipalities of Yamanashi Prefecture